The Nineteenth Texas Legislature met from January 13 to March 31, 1885 in its regular session. All members of the House of Representatives and about half of the members of the Senate were elected in 1884 General Election.

Sessions
19th Regular session: January 13–March 31, 1885

Party summary

Officers

Senate
 Lieutenant Governor
 Barnett Gibbs, Democrat
 President pro tempore
 William R. Shannon, Democrat, Regular session
 Constantine Buckley "Buck" Kilgore, Democrat, ad interim

House of Representatives
 Speaker of the House
 Lafayette Lumpkin Foster, Democrat

Members
Members of the Nineteenth Texas Legislature as of the beginning of the Regular Session, January 13, 1885:

Senate
Lochlin Johnson Farrar
George Washington Glasscock, Jr.
Temple Lea Houston
Constantine Buckley "Buck" Kilgore, Democrat, District 7
William R. Shannon
J. O. Terrell

House of Representatives
Members of the House of Representatives for the Nineteenth Texas Legislature:

Frank P. Alexander
William T. Armistead
Edwin Augustus Atlee
James Browning
William John Caven
Daniel Darroch
James H. Faubion
Lafayette Lumpkin Foster
Adolph Carl Ludwig Groos
Travis Henderson
Joseph Humphrey
J. Ras Jones
Thomas W. Kennedy
Jesse P. Loving
William McGaughey
Andrew Todd McKinney
Robert J. Moore
E. Taylor Moore
George Cassety Pendleton
James M. Robinson
Felix Ezell Smith
Benjamin Dudley Tarlton
Ammon Underwood
Benjamin Franklin Williams
J.P. Blount

Membership Changes

Senate

c

External links

19th Texas Legislature
1885 in Texas
1885 U.S. legislative sessions